Marie Le Rochois (c. 1658 – 8 October 1728) was a French operatic soprano who belonged to the Académie Royale de Musique. She is often referred to as Marthe Le Rochois or simply La Rochois.

Opera career

She was introduced to Jean-Baptiste Lully, possibly by his father-in-law Michel Lambert who may have been her teacher, and became a member of the Paris Opéra in 1678. She sang in operas by Lully, Pascal Collasse, Henri Desmarets, Marc-Antoine Charpentier, André Campra, Marin Marais, and André Cardinal Destouches but she was best regarded for her portrayal of Armide in Lully's opera.

Unlike some of her wilder colleagues at the opera, Julie d'Aubigny and Fanchon Moreau, she enjoyed a reputation for moral rectitude. Less of a celebrity, she was more of an artist, as indicated by the number of important roles with which she was entrusted by Lully and his successors.

Retirement

After retiring from the stage in 1698, she became a teacher, while remaining active in the contemporary arts social world. Her students included Marie Antier and Françoise Journet. She died in Paris in 1728.

Roles created
Arethusa  in Lully's Proserpine (Paris, 1680)
Merope in Lully's Persée (Paris, 1682)
Arcabonne in Lully's Amadis (Paris, 1684)
Angéligue in Lully's Roland (Paris, 1684)
Armide in Lully's Armide (Paris, 1686)
Galatée in Acis et Galatée (Paris, 1686)
Polixène in the Lully-Collasse Achille et Polyxène (Paris, 1687)
Thétis in Collasse's Thétis et Pélée (Paris, 1689)
Lavinie in Collasse's Enée et Lavinie (Paris, 1690)
The title role in Desmarets's Didon (Paris, 1693)
The title role in Charpentier's Médée (Paris, 1693)
Ariane in Marin Marais's Ariane et Bacchus (Paris, 1696)
Vénus in Desmarets's Vénus et Adonis (Paris, 1697)
The title role in Destouches's Issé (Paris, 1697)
Roxane in Campra's L'Europe galante (Paris, 1697)

Sources
Anthony, James R (1992), 'Le Rochois, Marie' in The New Grove Dictionary of Opera, ed. Stanley Sadie (London)

External links
Photoarchive/Grove page

1650s births
1728 deaths
French operatic sopranos
17th-century French women opera singers
18th-century French women opera singers